The M101A1 (previously designated M2A1) howitzer is an artillery piece developed and used by the United States. It was the standard U.S. light field howitzer in World War II and saw action in both the European and Pacific theaters and during the Korean War. Entering production in 1941, it quickly gained a reputation for accuracy and a powerful punch.

The weapon was adopted by many countries after World War II.

History

Development and designation

After World War I, the U.S. Army Ordnance Department studied various captured German 105 mm-caliber howitzers and developed the 105 mm Howitzer M1920 on Carriage M1920. A box trail carriage design (the M1925E carriage) and two other split trail designs (the T1 and T2) were also developed, but the original split trail design was found superior after testing. After being selected, the piece was standardized in December 1927 as the 105 mm howitzer M1 on carriage M1. The Army had an intention to replace all 75 mm gun-howitzers in its divisional and non-divisional field artillery regiments with 105 mm pieces, but a lack of appropriations stalled the idea and eventually forced it to be completely abandoned by 1929; a limited plan developed in 1925 envisioned re-equipping three regiments, but by 1933, only 14 M1 howitzers had been manufactured.

A modified version of the M1 was trialed in 1932 which used semi-fixed ammunition instead of separate-loading ammunition. Since this development required a different breech block, the new piece was designated the 105 mm howitzer M2 on carriage M1. 48 pieces were manufactured in 1939. The original M1 carriage had been designed for towing using horses rather than trucks, and a new carriage, the T5 (M2), was developed in 1939 and standardized in February 1940. The breech ring of the howitzer M2 was modified in March 1940 before large-scale production began, creating the 105 mm howitzer M2A1 on carriage M2.

The weapon was heavy for its calibre but this was because the gun was designed to be durable. Thus the barrel and carriage could see great use and remain functional without wearing out.

The U.S. military artillery designation system was changed in 1962, redesignating the M2A1 howitzer the M101A1. The gun continued to see service in the Korean and Vietnam Wars. Though a similar model, the M102 howitzer, shared the same roles in battle, it never fully replaced the M101A1. Today, the M101A1 has been retired by the U.S. military, though it continues to see service with many other countries. By the end of World War II, 8,536 105 mm towed howitzers had been built and post-war production continued at Rock Island Arsenal until 1953, by which time 10,202 had been built.

Australia
M2 Howitzers are still in limited service in the Australian Army Reserve, but are being replaced with  mortars with an emphasis on the retention of indirect fire support skills. In regular service they were replaced by the 105 mm L119 Hamel gun and the  M198 howitzers.

Canada
The Canadian Forces procured at least 60 US made M2A1 howitzers beginning in 1952, and starting in 1955, had Sorel Industries of Canada produce 232 of a slightly modified M2A2 version. The Canadian produced guns were later designated C1, while the US produced guns were designated C2. These continued in service until the early 2000s. In the late 1990s, ninety-six C1 guns were selected and sent to RDM in the Netherlands to extend their service life. These guns were re-designated as the C3. The changes include a longer barrel, a muzzle brake, reinforced trails and the removal of shield flaps. It remains the standard light howitzer of Canadian Forces Reserve units. The C3 is used by 1RCHA in Glacier National Park in British Columbia as a means of avalanche control. As well, the C3 is used to train Regular Force Artillery in Shilo MB.

Croatia
A number of M2/M101 howitzers were used by the Socialist Federal Republic of Yugoslavia and approximately 50 were inherited by Croatia, of which four are still in use for training with the Croatian Army.

France
The French Army used the M2 howitzer, designated HM2, in the Algerian War and during the Opération Tacaud in Chad. France later supplied a battery of HM2 to the Rwandan Armed Forces during the Rwandan Civil War that led into the Rwandan genocide.

Philippines
Several M101 howitzers are still in use with the Armed Forces of the Philippines and is normally used to battle rebels in Luzon, Visayas, and Mindanao. It was also used in direct fire against Islamic militants during the Battle of Marawi.

South Korea

Starting on 6 July 1950, South Korea received a total of 1,127 M2A1s until the end of the Korean War to supplement and replace the M1 75 mm howitzer and the M3 105 mm howitzer.

In the early 1970s, the ROK Armed Forces needed to replace these old howitzers due to the maintenance burden. To match North Korea's artillery capability, South Korea invested in the domestic arms industry to equip its large military cost efficiently. After completion of Project Thunder I, supported by the U.S. Department of Defense, for infantry weapons, in April 1972, the South Korean president Park Chung-hee ordered Project Thunder II for artillery weapons. The U.S. refused to cooperate due to the then diplomatic overtures to the People's Republic of China. The U.S. Embassy in South Korea ordered its technical team to withdraw, believing that South Korea lacked the tooling and knowledge to develop the weapons by itself. The Agency for Defense Development however, reverse engineered the M2A1 (M101A1), and prototype production began in March 1973.

On 25 June 1973, three prototypes were demonstrated publicly. After the test, the U.S. ambassador Philip Habib arranged the meeting of South Korean chief secretary O Won-cheol and colonel Montgomery from the Joint U.S. Military Affairs Group-Korea. The colonel provided technical review of the howitzer, and recommended purchasing of the U.S. equipment for logistics issues because the howitzer was not compatible with the U.S. standard. South Korea refused and pursued domestic design, but the two nations eventually signed an agreement for technology transfer in September 1973. It was the first weapons research cooperation between the two nations, and the South Korean defense industry began to form with guidance from the U.S.

In February 1974, hostilities grew after North Korea sunk a South Korean fishing boat and kidnapped fishermen near Baengnyeong Island. As a response, 10 howitzers crafted prior to the research cooperation were sent to the island, but pulled out after having severe malfunctions during operations. In November 1975, the reinforced variant experienced barrel breakdown; the failure led to the invitation of American engineers in January 1976 for an overview. After 1.5 months of inspection, the engineers suggested the Eighth United States Army replace South Korean copy with the original M101A1 design. The U.S. then provided its technical data package to South Korea, which quickly readied mass production of the howitzer before the year ended. Production began in 1977 as KM101A1 by Kia Machine Tool (now Hyundai Wia) in Changwon.

In 1978, South Korea restarted domestic howitzer program based on M101A1. The howitzer applied 38 calibers barrel for extending the maximum range to 18 km using RAP ammunition. Only 18 howitzers saw service with South Korean military in favor of mass-producing KH179 155 mm towed howitzer.

As of 2021, South Korea is the largest operator of the M101 howitzer with about 2,000 pieces in active service. It is planned to convert 1/3 of its inventory to K105A1 self-propelled howitzer.

Vietnam
France and the State of Vietnam used M2A1 howitzers during the First Indochina War, as did the Viet Minh guerilla forces they fought against, who were supplied with at least 24 by the People's Republic of China, along with other captured American artillery pieces and mortars formerly operated by both Nationalist Chinese forces (the Kuomintang military) and US troops fighting in Korea. Today upgraded M2A1 howitzers (some of which have been mounted on trucks and employed as self-propelled artillery) are still being used by the People's Army of Vietnam (the PAVN).

Other uses
In addition, the M101 has found a second use in the U.S. as an avalanche control gun, supervised by the US Forest Service and the US Army TACOM's cooperative effort in the Avalanche Artillery Users of North America Committee (AAUNAC).  The M101 is used by a number of ski areas and state departments of transportation for long-range control work. Under the designation of M2A2, the 2nd Battalion, 2nd Field Artillery Regiment, 428th Field Artillery Brigade performs salutes with 7 guns with World War II Medal of Honor recipient names on their barrels.

Variants
Gun variants:
 M1920 – prototype.
 M1925E – prototype.
 T2 prototype, standardized as M1.
 M2 (1934) – minor changes to the chamber to allow the use of fixed ammunition.
 M2A1 (1940) – modified breech ring.
 T8 prototype (standardized as 105 mm M4 Howitzer in September, 1943) – vehicle-mounted variant with modified breech and with cylindrical recoil surface.
 M101 – post-war designation of M2A1 on carriage M2A1
 M101A1 – post-war designation of M2A1 on carriage M2A2
 M2A1 modernized variant by Yugoimport SDPR with max range of 18.1 km and 8 rds per minute
 C3 – Canadian C1 (M2A1) with lengthened, 33-caliber barrel
 KM101A1 - South Korean license of M101A1, 1977
 KH178 105 mm Towed Howitzer - South Korean 38 calibers variant, 1983
Carriage variants:
 M1920E – prototype, split trail.
 M1921E – prototype, box trail.
 M1925E – prototype, box trail.
 T2, standardized as M1 – split trail, wooden wheels.
 M1A1 – M1 carriages rebuilt with new wheels, brakes and other parts.
 T3 – prototype.
 T4 – prototype.
 T5, standardized as M2 (1940) – split trail, steel wheels with pneumatic tires.
 M2A1 – electric brakes removed.
 M2A2 – modified shield.
 XM124 & XM124E1 Light Auxiliary Propelled Howitzer – prototype (1962–1965) – produced by Sundstrand Aviation Corporation, who added an auxiliary drive system for local maneuverability (See also similar XM123 Medium Auxiliary Propelled 155 mm Howitzer with similar configuration). The base XM124 provided two , air-cooled engines, while the XM124E1 provided a single  engine and electric steering.
 M2A2 Terra Star Auxiliary Propelled Howitzer – prototype (1969–1977) – Lockheed Aircraft Service Company added an auxiliary drive system and a tri-star wheel system to the carriage of an M2A2 105 mm Light Howitzer to provide local maneuverability. The last surviving example is at the Rock Island Arsenal Museum.

Self-propelled mounts
 Medium Tank M4A4E1 – M2A1 in mount T70.
 Medium Tank M4(105), M4A3(105) – M4 in mount M52.
 Medium/Heavy Tank M45 – M4 in mount M71.
 Experimental mount on Holt tractor – 
 Experimental chassis designed by J Walter Christie – M1920.
 105 mm Howitzer Motor Carriage T9 (based on Cletrac MG-2 tractor).
 105 mm Howitzer Motor Carriage T19 (based on M3 halftrack) – M2A1.
 105 mm Howitzer Motor Carriage T32 / M7 – M2A1.
 105 mm Howitzer Motor Carriage T76 / M37 (Light Tank M24 chassis) – M4 in mount M5.
 105 mm Howitzer Motor Carriage T88 (76 mm GMC M18 chassis) – M4 in mount M20.
 K105HT 105 mm howitzer mounted on an armored 5-ton truck system built by Samsung Techwin for the Republic of Korea Army (initially called EVO-105)
 Vietnamese M101 howitzer mounted on an Ural-375D 6×6 truck.

Ammunition
The gun fired semi-fixed ammunition, with 105 mm Cartridge Case M14. The propelling charge consisted of a base charge and six increments, forming seven charges from 1 (the smallest) to 7 (the largest). Use of M1 HE rounds prepared for the 105 mm howitzer M3 (same projectile and cartridge, but different propelling charge) was authorized.

HEAT M67 Shell was originally designed as fixed round, with Cartridge Case M14 type II. It was later changed to semi-fixed type with the standard cartridge, but with non-adjustable propelling charge. For blank ammunition, a shorter Cartridge Case M15 with black powder charge was used.

Operators

 
 
 : Haubitze M1A2
 
  M101A1 variant. 50 delivered in 1982. Status uncertain. 
 
 
 
 
 
 
 
  Designated C3 - Canadian C1 (M2A1) with lengthened, 33-caliber barrel
 
 
 
 
 
 
 
 
 
 
 
 
  (As salute gun only)
 
 
 
 
 
 
 
 
 
 
 
 
 
 
 
 
 
 
 
 
  - 242 in service
 
 
 
 
 
 
 
 
 
 
 
 
 
 
 
 
  (For avalanche control)

See also
 List of U.S. Army weapons by supply catalog designation (SNL C-21)
 M3 howitzer – Shortened barrel variant of M2 howitzer.
 M102 howitzer – The US partial replacement for M101 howitzer.
 KH178 105 mm Towed Howitzer – South Korean 38 calibers variant of M101A1.
 Indian field gun – Indian 105 mm howitzer.
 L118 light gun – British 105 mm howitzer.
 M119 howitzer – The US license of L118, replacement for M101 and M102 howitzer.
 GIAT LG1 – French 105 mm howitzer.

Notes

References

External links

 Two Guns For One, November 1942, Popular Science one of the earliest detailed public article published on the M101 Howitzer
 FAS Military Analysis Network

105 mm artillery
World War II field artillery
Field artillery of the Cold War
World War II artillery of the United States
Cold War artillery of the United States
Artillery of the United States
Weapons and ammunition introduced in 1941